The 1922 Notre Dame Fighting Irish football team represented the University of Notre Dame during the 1922 college football season, led by fifth-year head coach Knute Rockne.

The Irish played a scoreless tie at Army on Armistice Day, and lost the season finale at Nebraska on Thanksgiving for an  record.

Schedule

References

Notre Dame
Notre Dame Fighting Irish football seasons
Notre Dame Fighting Irish football